Talia'uli Latukefu is an Australian actor and singer, best known for his roles as Dwayne Johnson in the NBC comedy Young Rock and Byamba in the American Netflix series Marco Polo. He also played Darren Ngata in the popular Australian dramatic series Doctor Doctor in series 2–4 from 2017 to 2020. He played Cole in the short film Alien: Covenant - Prologue: Last Supper and the feature film Alien: Covenant, both directed by Ridley Scott; Last Supper was released on February 22, 2017, and Covenant on May 19, 2017.  He is also known for his role as Father Matteo in the psychological thriller miniseries Devil's Playground and as "Kool Kris" in the Chris Lilley mockumentary series Jonah from Tonga. In 2004, he was a contestant in the reality singing competition series Australian Idol. In 2022, he portrayed the superhero The Champion in the DC Extended Universe (DCEU) film Black Adam.

Of Tongan descent, Latukefu is a graduate of the National Institute of Dramatic Art (NIDA). He lives in Sydney, Australia.

Filmography

Film

Television

References

External links
 

Living people
Australian male film actors
Australian male television actors
Australian people of Tongan descent
National Institute of Dramatic Art alumni
Year of birth missing (living people)